Georges Friedland (1910–1993) was a French screenwriter, film director and editor.

Selected filmography
 The Brighton Twins (1936)
 Princess Tarakanova (1938)
 Gibraltar (1938)
 Murder with Music (1941)
 Nine Boys, One Heart (1948)
 The Smugglers' Banquet (1952)
  (1959)

References

Bibliography
 Capua, Michelangelo. Anatole Litvak: The Life and Films. McFarland, 2015.

External links

1910 births
1993 deaths
French film editors
20th-century French screenwriters
Film directors from Paris